Paris Diderot University, also known as Paris 7, was a French university located in Paris, France. It was one of the inheritors of the historic University of Paris, which was split into 13 universities in 1970. Paris Diderot merged with Paris Descartes University in 2019 to form the University of Paris, which was later renamed Paris Cité University.

With two Nobel Prize laureates, two Fields Medal winners and two former French Ministers of Education among its faculty or former faculty, the university was famous for its teaching in science, especially in mathematics. Many fundamental results of the theory of probability were discovered at one of its research centres, the Laboratoire de Probabilités et Modèles Aléatoires (Laboratory of Probability and Random Models).

History

Paris Diderot University was one of the heirs of the old University of Paris, which ceased to exist in 1970. Professors from the faculties of Science, of Medicine and of Humanities chose then to create a new multidisciplinary university. It adopted its current name in 1994 after the 18th-century French philosopher, art critic and writer Denis Diderot.

Formerly based at the Jussieu Campus, in the 5th arrondissement, the university moved to a new campus in the 13th arrondissement, in the Paris Rive Gauche neighbourhood. The first buildings were brought into use in 2006. The university had many facilities in Paris and two in other places of the general area. In 2012, the university completed its move in its new ultramodern campus.

Paris Diderot University was a founding member of the higher education and research alliance Sorbonne Paris Cité, a public institution for scientific co-operation, bringing together four renowned Parisian universities and four higher education and research institutes.

The university became a member of the Sorbonne Paris University Group on March 31, 2010. It merged with the Paris Descartes University in 2019, gaining its new appellation, the University of Paris.

List of facilities in Paris

There are:
PRG (Paris Rive Gauche) - Main campus
Jussieu Campus - former Main campus
Charles V - English studies
RFF Building - Administrative offices
Javelot - Geography, history and social science (GHSS)
Chateau des Rentiers - Linguistics
Garancière - Odontology
Xavier-Bichat - Medicine
Lariboisière Saint-Louis - Medicine
St Louis Hospital - Hematology
Rue de Paradis - Medicine

UFR (Unité de Formation et de Recherche)
Paris Diderot University offers courses in many fields, each taught in a different sections of the university called UFR - Unité de Formation et de Recherche (Unity of Teaching and Research).

 UFR of Life Sciences
 UFR of Chemistry
 UFR of Computer Sciences
 UFR of Mathematics
 UFR of Physics
 UFR of Science of the Earth, Environment and Planets
 UFR of English studies
 UFR of Cross-cultural and Applied Languages studies
 UFR of Geography, History and Social sciences
 UFR of Languages and Cultures in East Asia studies (Chinese, Japanese, Korean and Vietnamese)
 UFR of Letters, Art and Cinema
 UFR of Linguistics
 UFR of Psychoanalytical Studies (formerly Human clinical sciences)
 UFR of Social Sciences
 UFR of Medicine
 UFR of Odontology

Academic degrees
There are:

 1 Diplôme universitaire de technologie (called DUT)
 27 Different bachelor's degrees (Licence)
 32 Different master's degrees  (116 specialities)
 1 Engineering school
 24 different Ph.Ds (Doctorat)

Teachers and former teachers

 Jaak Aaviksoo, Estonian Minister of Defense
 Claude Allègre, Minister of National Education (France) from 1997 to 2000 and member of the Académie des sciences (France)
 Artur Avila, 2014 Fields Medal
 Jean-Luc Bennahmias, French Member of the European Parliament
 Bernard Cerquiglini, rector of the Agence universitaire de la Francophonie
 Michel Ciment, French journalist, writer and president of FIPRESCI
 Vincent Courtillot, geophysicist, member of the Académie des sciences (France)
 Jean Dausset, Nobel Prize in Medicine 1980
 Luc Ferry, French Minister of National Education from 2002 to 2004
 Julia Kristeva, Bulgarian-French psychoanalyst, sociologist and feminist
 Robert Mallet, writer
 Thierry Morand, French biocontainment expert and entrepreneur.
 Élisabeth Roudinesco, French historian and psychoanalyst
 Jean-Michel Savéant, member of the Académie des sciences (France)
 Marcel-Paul Schützenberger, French mathematician
 Laurent Schwartz, 1950 Fields Medal,
 Justin E. H. Smith, author and professor of history and philosophy of science
 George Fitzgerald Smoot, Nobel Prize in Physics 2006 for the discovery of anisotropies in the cosmic microwave background radiation
 Yazdan Yazdanpanah, infectiologist
 Stefano Zacchiroli, Former Debian Project Leader

References

External links

 University homepage
 Map of facilities 

 
1970 establishments in France
2019 disestablishments in France
Universities descended from the University of Paris
Educational institutions established in 1970
Educational institutions disestablished in 2019